Padang is the capital and largest city of the Indonesian province of West Sumatra. With a Census population of 1,015,000  as of 2022, it is the 16th most populous city in Indonesia and the most populous city on the west coast of Sumatra. The Padang metropolitan area is the third most populous metropolitan area in Sumatra with a population of over 1.4 million. Padang is widely known for its Minangkabau culture, cuisine, and sunset beaches.

The city had historically been a trading center since the pre-colonial era, trading in pepper and gold. The Dutch made contact with the city in the mid 17th century, eventually constructing a fortress and taking over control of the city from the Pagaruyung Kingdom. Save for several interruptions of British rule, Padang remained part of the Dutch East Indies as one of its major cities until Indonesian independence. In 1906, Padang along with Palembang became the first populated places in Sumatra to achieve city status (gemeente).

History

Padang has been a trade centre since the 16th century, having been controlled by the Pagaruyung Kingdom and the Aceh Sultanate. During the 16th and 17th centuries pepper was cultivated and traded with India, Portugal, the United Kingdom and the Netherlands. In 1663 the city came under the authority of the Dutch and a trading post was built in 1680. The city came under the British Empire twice, firstly from 1781 to 1784 during the Fourth Anglo-Dutch War, and again from 1795 to 1819 during the Napoleonic Wars. In 1819 the city was transferred back to the Netherlands. Up to circa 1780 the most important trade product was gold originating from gold mines in the region. When the mines were exhausted, the focus turned to other products such as coffee, salts and textiles.

In 1797 Padang was inundated by a tsunami with an estimated flow depth of 5–10 metres, following an earthquake, estimated to be 8.5–8.7 Mw, which occurred off the coast. The shaking caused considerable damage and the deaths of two people, while the tsunami resulted in several houses being washed away and several deaths at the village of Air Manis. Boats moored in the Arau river ended up on dry land, including a 200-ton sailing ship which was deposited about 1 kilometre upstream. In 1833 another tsunami inundated Padang with an estimated flow depth of 3–4 metres as a result of an earthquake, estimated to be 8.6–8.9 Mw, which occurred off Bengkulu. The shaking caused considerable damage in Padang, and due to the tsunami boats moored in the Arau river broke their anchors and were scattered.

The population of Padang in 1920 was 28,754, the second largest city in Sumatra behind Palembang. At the time of independence in the 1940s the city had around 50,000 inhabitants. Coffee was still important, but copra was also a major item produced by farmers in its hinterland.  The population growth since then has been partly a result of growth in the area of the city, but largely is a result of the migration to major cities seen in so many developing nations. From 1950 the Ombilin coal field developed with Padang as its outlet port. This was seen by some observers as reflecting the economic and political colonisation of Indonesia.

On 30 September 2009, a 7.9 magnitude earthquake hit about 50 kilometres off the coast of Padang. There were more than 1,100 fatalities, 313 of which occurred within Padang.

Geography
The city of Padang is located on the west coast of the island of Sumatra, with a total area of 694.96 km2, equivalent to 1.65% of the area of West Sumatra. More than 60% of the area of Padang is in the form of hills covered by protection forests. Only around 205.007 km2 of the territory is an urban area. The hills stretch in the east and south of the city. The notable hills in Padang include Lampu Hill, Mount Padang, Gado-Gado Hill, and Pegambiran Hill. The city of Padang has a coastline of 68.126 km on the mainland of Sumatra. In addition, there are also 19 small islands, including Sikuai Island with an area of 4.4 ha in Bungus Teluk Kabung District, and Toran Island covering 25 ha and Pisang Gadang Island in Padang Selatan District.

Climate
Padang features a tropical rainforest climate under Köppen's climate classification. Since this tropical rainforest climate is more subject to the Intertropical Convergence Zone than the trade winds and cyclones are very rare, it is equatorial. Padang is one of Indonesia's wettest cities, with frequent rainfall throughout the course of the year. The city averages roughly 4300 mm of rain per year. Padang's driest month is February, where 250 mm of precipitation on average is observed. The city temperatures are relatively constant throughout the year, with an average of 26 degrees Celsius. Padang has 21 rivers, with the longest being Batang Kandis with a length of 20 km. In 1980 two-thirds of the city was flooded because the city's drainage which primarily empties to Batang Arau could not contain the water.

Governance
By 2007 the city government began a number of religiously motivated policies. One requires females of all religious backgrounds who are municipal employees and students in government schools to wear jilbab (hijab), and high school students now take classes on reading the Qur'an. Municipal employees are required to pay zakat.

Administrative districts

The city of Padang is divided into eleven districts (kecamatan), listed below with their areas and their populations at the 2010 Census and the 2020 Census.

Adipura award
As of 2017, Padang had received the "Adipura" (cleanest and greenest city) award in the category of large city 18 times and the "Adipura Kencana" award three times.

Culture

Cuisine

The cuisine of the Minangkabau people is commonly called Padang cuisine. Padang restaurants are common throughout the country and are famous for their spicy food. Padang food is usually cooked once per day, and all customers choose from those dishes, which are left out on display until no food is left. It is served in small portions of various dishes, but constituting, with rice, a complete meal. Customers take – and pay for – only what they want from this array of dishes. The best known Padang dish is rendang, a spicy meat stew. Soto Padang (crispy beef in spicy soup) is local residents' breakfast favourite, meanwhile sate (beef satay in curry sauce served with ketupat) is a treat in the evening.

Tourism

Padang is a common transit point for surfers travelling to Batu Islands and Mentawai Islands, and for tourists visiting the West Sumatran highlands. Padang beach (known as Taplau or Tapi Lauik) which located from Samudra Street until Puruih, is known for its sunsets and food stalls. Kuranji River flows in Padang and on top area of the river at Batu Busuk, Lambung Bukit sub-district is suitable for white water activities. Bungus bay, to the south of Padang, is suitable for swimming and boating. There are some offshore islands near Bungus, such as Sikuai island and Pagang island.

Currently, Regional Development Planning Board (Bappeda) of Padang has established development plans "Padang Old City" in Kampung Pondok, South Padang district as a tourist area. Mayor of Padang has been designate 73 historic buildings as cultural heritage of Padang.

Landmarks 

There are many old buildings in Padang that still retain their Dutch and Chinese architecture. The old city of Padang, located next to Muaro Harbor at Arau River, which formerly functioned as the city's main commercial avenue. The old city was the former business district of Padang, there are many important buildings such as Padang City Hall, De Javaschebank (present-day Bank Indonesia), Nederlandsch Spaarbank, Geo Wehry & Co, Escompto Maatschappij Office, warehouses, and merchant houses.

There are several historic places such as Adityawarman Museum which specialises in the history and culture of the local Minangkabau ethnic group, and the main exhibits are housed within a Rumah Gadang style building. Grand Mosque of West Sumatra, a new modern large mosque that is built with Minangkabau architecture. The Mosque is located on Jalan Khatib Sulaiman, city centre of Padang. Ganting Grand Mosque, the oldest mosque in Padang and one of the oldest in Indonesia, is a popular tourist attraction. Muhammadan Mosque, founded by Indian merchant, is also located in the city centre. St. Leo Monastery features a mixture of traditional Minang architecture on its bell tower roofing and Dutch architecture on the church building, is one of the oldest churches in Padang. Along the beachside road, just down from the Tourist Information office is a Buddhist Temple, Vihara Buddha Warman, opened in 2006 for the large Chinese Buddhist community.

Beaches and parks
Air Manis Beach, sweet water beach is located 10 km south of Padang, location of the legendary Malin Kundang Stone. The rock formations are found which resemble ship wrecks. Across from the Arau River is the Siti Nurbaya Park which can reached by bridge or boat. There are still remains of Japanese cannons and bunkers from World War II. There are great views of Padang city, Arau River and the Indian Ocean. Bung Hatta Nature Reserve (Taman Hutan Raya Bung Hatta) is situated 18 km east of the city, with diverse flora and fauna including a few Sumatran tigers, tapirs, wild goats, bears, as well as Raflesia Gaduansi, Balangphora, and Amorphopalus.

Shopping
Padang also has some modern malls, including Transmart, Basko Grand Mall, SPR Plaza, Plaza Andalas, and Rocky Plaza. The upcoming malls in the city are Padang Landmark Mall and Padang Green City.

Sports

Padang is the hometown of the soccer team Semen Padang, with Haji Agus Salim Stadium being the home stadium of the club. Padang also is home to an annual international professional road bicycle racing—Tour de Singkarak—and once host the Fourth International Traditional (Dragonboat) Festival.

Infrastructure

Public transport
The TransPadang bus rapid transit service was developed used Jakarta's TransJakarta system as a model, but without a dedicated lane and comfortable shelters. Today Trans Padang runs only from Lubuk Buaya to Pasar Raya, a distance of 18 km, with a fleet of 10 large buses (capacity 60) and 15 medium buses (capacity 40). Daily passengers number 7,000, an increase from the initial ridership of 4,000. The load factor is 128% in the morning and evening rush hours.

Airport
The city is served by the newly opened Minangkabau International Airport in Ketaping, Padang Pariaman. It replaces the old Tabing Airport, which is currently used as a military base. There is one terminal building for both international and domestic flights. The airport has 4 aerobridges, 17 check-in counters, 5 baggage conveyors, and 9 ticket sales counters. In late 2013, the runway was lengthened by 250 metres so that it could accommodate Boeing 747 and Airbus A340 planes. There is also a connection from the airport to the city center with a train service. A terminal expansion (Phase II) has been announced with the rendering already released on the Angkasa Pura 2 website.

Seaport
Padang's Teluk Bayur harbour (the former Emmahaven Port) is the largest and busiest harbour on the west coast of Sumatra. It serves inter-island as well as international routes. It was built in 1888 by the colonial government of the Netherlands. On 29 April 2013 a new container terminal was officially opened by West Sumatra Governor which can hold more than 4,000 containers in 46,886 square-meter area. The port is the main gateway to the Mentawai islands, including Siberut, Sipora, and South Pagai. There are also ferry connections between Padang to Jakarta and Sibolga next to Gunung Sitoli (Nias).

Toll road
West Sumatra administration has secured lands for the construction of a 28-kilometres toll road between Padang and Sicincin district with about Rp.1.3 trillion ($141.7 million) investment. It is a part of Padang-Pekanbaru toll road with a total length of 244 kilometres. 80 percent of the land with a width of 30 metres has been acquired, but they will acquire more land to meet an ideal width of 50 metres. The construction project has officially began in February 2018.

Railroad
Railroad tracks connect Padang to Pariaman to the north, Padangpanjang to the northeast, Solok and Sawahlunto to the east. The largest train station is Padang Station, known as Simpang Haru station. Sibinuang and Dang Tuanku provides the trip services from Padang (Simpang Haru) to Pariaman vice versa.

Tsunami shelter
Government and the people of Hill Pangilun has agreed to make Mount Pangilun as tsunami shelter. Better road access to the hill will be built, as well as temporary shelters, including their facilities.

Education
 
There are two institutes of higher education in Padang, i.e. Andalas University and the State University of Padang. Andalas University is the oldest university in Indonesia outside of Java. The Faculty of Medicine and Faculty of Dentistry are located in the city centre, near the Central General Hospital M. Djamil. State University of Padang located in Air Tawar.

The other universities in Padang are Imam Bonjol State Islamic University, Padang Technology Institute in Lapai, Bung Hatta University in Ulak Karang, Baiturrahmah University in Air Pacah, Putra Indonesia YPTK University, Ekasakti University, West Sumatra Muhammadiyah University, and Tamansiswa University.

Notable people
 
 
Johannes Vallentin Dominicus Werbata (1866-1929)

Twin towns – sister cities

 Bà Rịa–Vũng Tàu, Vietnam
 Beit Lahia, Palestine
 Suzhou, China

References

Notes

External links

 Official website

 
Populated coastal places in Indonesia
Populated places established in 1669
Port cities and towns in Indonesia
Provincial capitals in Indonesia